University Hall may refer to:
Original name of Clare College, Cambridge
Flinders University Hall
University Hall (Bristol)
University Hall (Brown University)
University Hall (Dublin)
University Hall (Harvard University)
University Hall (Leuven)
University Hall (Indiana State University)
University Hall (Northwestern University)
University Hall (Ohio State University)
University Hall (University of Canterbury)
University Hall (University of Hong Kong)
University Hall (University of Illinois Chicago)
University Hall (University of Montana)
University Hall (University of Oregon)
University Hall (University of St Andrews)
University Hall (University of Toledo)
University Hall (University of Virginia)
University Hall (Uppsala University)
University Hall, within University of Western Australia
University Hall, Gordon Square, London, home of Dr Williams's Library
University Hall, within Kwame Nkrumah University of Science and Technology, Ghana

Architectural disambiguation pages